22nd Street station is a Caltrain commuter rail station located south of 22nd Street between the Dogpatch and Potrero Hill neighborhoods of San Francisco, California beneath the Interstate 280 freeway viaduct. The only below-grade Caltrain station, it is bracketed on the north and south by two tunnels which take the line under the eastern slope of Potrero Hill. The station is reached only by stairways from 22nd Street and Iowa Street – there are no ramps or elevators between the platforms and street level – and is thus not accessible. The narrow stairways create bottlenecks, especially when northbound trains arrive. A December 2021 study recommended the installation of ramps as an interim accessibility measure pending future reconstruction or relocation.

The station opened when the Southern Pacific Railroad built the Bayshore Cutoff in 1907. The station was originally known as 23rd Street. The former wooden stairways were replaced with metal stairs in 2007.

Under the Pennsylvania Avenue alternative of the Downtown Rail Extension project, Caltrain tracks would be placed in a new tunnel north of 22nd Street. The existing station would be replaced by a new station, either at the existing site, or potentially north at Mariposa Street or south at Cesar Chavez Street.

References

External links 

Caltrain – 22nd Street station

Caltrain stations in San Francisco
Mission District, San Francisco
Potrero Hill, San Francisco
Railway stations in the United States opened in 1907
1907 establishments in California
23rd Street